Giuseppe Kirsten was a prelate of the Catholic Church who served as bishop of the Roman Catholic Diocese of Makurdi. He was appointed prefect in 1937. He died in 1947.

References 

1947 deaths
Roman Catholic bishops of Makurdi